Agrotis dislocata, the lesser native cutworm, is a moth of the family Noctuidae. It was first described by Francis Walker in 1856. It is endemic to the Hawaiian islands of Niihau, Kauai, Oahu, Molokai, Maui, Lanai, Hawaii and Laysan.

The larvae feed on various garden crops, Chenopodium, grasses and sugarcane. It can be a pest in sugarcane, in gardens and in other crops.

External links

Agrotis
Endemic moths of Hawaii
Moths described in 1856